Sippo may refer to:

 Sippo, Ohio, unincorporated community
 Teemu Sippo (born 1947), Catholic bishop of Helsinki